Foodex is a chain of locally owned independent grocery stores in rural areas of Newfoundland and Labrador. It is owned by Atlantic Grocery Distributors Limited of Bay Roberts, Newfoundland and Labrador.

See also
List of Canadian supermarkets

External links
Atlantic Grocery Distributors - Retail

Supermarkets of Canada
Food and drink in Newfoundland and Labrador
Companies based in Newfoundland and Labrador